The Canadian Olympic Committee (COC) is a private, non-profit organization that represents Canada at the International Olympic Committee (IOC). It is also a member of the Pan American Sports Organization (PASO).

History 
While Canadian athletes first competed at the Olympic Games at Paris 1900 followed by St. Louis 1904, it was not until 1907 that the IOC officially recognized a National Olympic Committee (NOC) for Canada. The next year, Colonel John Hanbury-Williams was recognized as the Chairman of the Canadian Olympic Committee for the London 1908 Olympic Games. Hanbury-Williams became Canada's first IOC member in 1911.

After another Canadian Olympic Committee was created with the purpose of organizing a team for the 1912 Olympic Games in Stockholm, it was reported that the IOC wanted permanent NOCs. In 1913, the Amateur Athletic Union of Canada (AAUC) created the Canadian Olympic Association with James Merrick as chairman, a position he held until 1921 when he succeeded Hanbury-Williams as IOC member.

In 1921, the renamed Canadian Olympic Committee became a standing committee of the AAUC and a year later Patrick J. Mulqueen was elected chairman, a position he held until 1946. In 1937, the organization was renamed the Canadian Olympic Association (COA), but remained within the AAUC. It wasn't until the AAUC annual meeting in November 1949 that the foundation was laid for an independent COA, which came to fruition in January 1952.

In April 2002, the organization was once again renamed the Canadian Olympic Committee, bringing it in line with most other NOCs and making the acronym the same in English and French.

On May 29, 2009, the COC and Barbados Olympic Association (BOA) signed a memorandum of understanding for co-operation between both bodies. Under the deal, the president of the Canadian Olympic Committee remarked that "Signing this Memorandum of Understanding helps us work even more closely with our colleagues in Barbados to improve sport development for both Barbadian and Canadian athletes and coaches."

The deal covers a pledge of both national Olympic committees to develop stronger partnerships between sport federations of Canada and Barbados with athlete development an area of focus. This includes the free exchange of coaches, officials, trainers, judges, experts and scientists for participation in seminars, courses and counselling.

In December 2014, the COC partnered with Egale Canada and the international You Can Play foundation, announcing a program to combat homophobia in sport by addressing LGBT issues as part of its mandate.

Team Canada 
The first official Team Canada competed at the 1908 Olympic Games in London. Team Canada has competed at every edition of the Games of the Olympiad since then, with the exception of Moscow 1980.

Team Canada has competed at every edition of the Olympic Winter Games, beginning with the first at Chamonix 1924.

Team Canada has participated at every edition of the Youth Olympic Games, beginning with the first at Singapore 2010.

Team Canada has competed at every edition of the Pan American Games, with the exception of the first at Buenos Aires 1951 because, at the time, countries of the Commonwealth did not participate in the Pan American Sports Congress.

List of presidents
 John Hanbury-Williams, 1907–1911
 James Merrick, 1911–1921
 Patrick J. Mulqueen, 1922–1946
 Andrew Sidney Dawes, 1946–1953
 Kenneth Farmer, 1953–1961
 James Worrall, 1961–1968
 Howard Radford, 1968–1969
 Harold Wright, 1969–1977
 Dick Pound, 1977–1982
 Roger Jackson, 1982–1990
 Wayne Hellquist, 1994
 William J. Warren, 1994–2001
 Michael A. Chambers, 2001–2010
 Marcel Aubut, 2010–2015
 Tricia Smith, 2015–present

See also
 Canada at the Olympics
 Canadian Paralympic Committee
Commonwealth Sport Canada

References

Further reading

External links
 Official website

Olympics
National Olympic Committees
Canada at the Olympics
Organizations based in Toronto
Sports organizations established in 1904
1904 establishments in Ontario